HMS Opportune was an O-class destroyer of the Royal Navy. She was ordered from John I. Thornycroft & Company, Woolston on 3 September 1939 for the 1st Emergency Flotilla. She was commissioned on 14 August 1942. She was the second Royal Navy ship borne Opportune.

She served throughout the Second World War, mainly as an escort ship for convoys, and remained with the Royal Navy until the mid-1950s.

Service history

Convoy Duty 1942
Enemy action affected Opportune before she was even completed, as German bombing in 1940 severely damaged the shipyard and enemy action delayed the delivery of components.  It was for these reasons that her completion was delayed until 1942.

When she was eventually launched, she was with the 17th Destroyer Flotilla with the Home Fleet.  During trials, she assisted in escorting convoy PW-202 to Bristol.

Her first real duty was escorting the Arctic convoy PQ-18 to the Russian port at Murmansk. On 20 September, she was required to assist the destroyer  which had been torpedoed by the German U-boat . Opportune helped transport some of Somalis survivors to Scapa Flow.

Operation Torch
In October 1942, Opportune escorted Fleet Admiral Sir Andrew Cunningham on board the cruiser  to Gibraltar in preparation for Operation Torch, the invasion of North Africa. In preparation for the landings, she carried out three days of anti-submarine patrols in the Mediterranean Sea.  On the day of the invasion itself, she was deployed as the escort for part of Force H and supported their role in the operation.

After ten days, she returned to Home Waters, escorting the battleship  and aircraft carrier  to Scapa Flow.  En route, Fairey Swordfish and Albacore aircraft from the carrier Victorious attacked the U-boat .  It was damaged and forced to surface, upon which its crew were taken prisoner by Opportune. The U-boat later sank, while 52 survivors of the 53-strong crew were taken to Greenock for transport to a prisoner-of-war camp.

Convoy Duty 1943
She resumed her Arctic convoy escort role after arriving at Scapa Flow and continued in this capacity from December 1942 through to March 1943. During this period, she escorted convoy JW 53 through extremely tough weather and earned salvage money when she rescued the stricken merchantman John H. B. Latrobe from a German minefield.

In March, Opportune was assigned to the 5th Support Group for Atlantic convoy defence. Just over a month after being reassigned, on 25 April, she helped sink the U-boat  with the destroyer  and aircraft from the carrier . On 12 May, she once again attacked a U-boat, this time  which was never seen again and is presumed to have been sunk. She continued in the Atlantic convoy defence duties as well as fleet duties in the Northwest Approaches for some months. On 14 September, this included escorting the Prime Minister to Canada for the Québec Conference of 1943.

In October 1943, Opportune was part of Operation Leader, escorting several Royal Navy ships and the US aircraft carrier  in attacks on German positions in Bodø, Norway.

Sinking Scharnhorst

In December, she was once again escorting convoys to the Soviet Union through the long Arctic nights. She was present at the Battle of North Cape, when Scharnhorst came under repeated fire from numerous Royal Navy warships. The German ship proved a tough opponent, and although she was outnumbered, outgunned and blinded by a direct hit to her radar, she managed to elude her pursuers for many hours. Most of the British capital ships had fired all of their torpedoes so the destroyers Opportune,  and  closed in and fired a total of nineteen torpedoes at Scharnhorst, scoring six hits. The ship finally keeled over and sank. The relentlessness of Scharnhorsts fight was noted and respected by the victorious British commanding officers.

Normandy Landings
In the new year, she was once again in Arctic convoy escort duty until March, when she was deployed in counter E-boat operations in preparation for the Normandy Landings, which would take place a few months later. She still escorted Arctic convoys, but she was being prepared for the invasion. In April, when she was recalled for a boiler clean and minor re-fit, she was permanently assigned to Task Force 27 in the English Channel.

During a disastrous full scale rehearsal of the Utah Beach landing on 28 April, Opportune engaged German E-boats which had sighted and engaged eight US landing craft on their way to the Slapton Sands.  The E-boats escaped after deploying a smokescreen, but over 638 US servicemen were killed in their attack. Many casualties were US Army personnel who were not properly trained and had difficulties with the life-jackets and other equipment, and drowned whilst awaiting rescue. The disaster nearly caused D-day itself to be cancelled, as it was thought some ten soldiers with full knowledge of the operation could have been captured by the Germans, it was only the subsequent discovery of their bodies which saved the operation.

The actual landings on 6 June were much less eventful. Opportune patrolled in the eastern stretches of the English Channel, guarding against a German naval attack.  She didn't encounter a single hostile boat, although she did engage E-boats in July and August, while supporting operations in France.

Convoy Duty 1944 & 45
After the successful invasion of Normandy, Opportune was once again deployed to convoy defence in the Arctic and minelaying roles.  She was occasionally deployed with Force 3 in operations off Norway.  These duties continued into 1945 and through to the end of the war.

Postwar career
Opportune remained in service after VJ Day and deployed at Portsmouth for submarine training and Local Flotilla duties until 1950. She then refitted and joined the Nore Local Flotilla.  The ship was placed in Reserve at Chatham Dockyard in November 1952.  Transferred to Portsmouth in July 1953 she went on the Disposal List the next year.  After sale to BISCO in November 1955 she arrived in tow at Milford Haven on 25 November to be broken-up by Thos. W. Ward.

References

Publications

External links

 HMS Opportune, destroyer
 uboat.net

 

O and P-class destroyers
Ships built in Southampton
1942 ships
World War II destroyers of the United Kingdom
Cold War destroyers of the United Kingdom
Ships built by John I. Thornycroft & Company